Jamie Nicholls (born 21 July 1993) is a British snowboarder who competes in slopestyle.

Nicholls was born in Bradford. He qualified for the 2014 Winter Olympics in Sochi, Russia. On 6 February 2014 in the qualification event Nicholls finished the fourth in his heat and qualified directly for the final. He finished 6th in the men's slopestyle final at the 2014 Winter Olympics.

He became the first British male snowboarder to win a World Cup event when he finished top of the standings in the final slopestyle event of the 2015-16 season, the Audi Snowjam in Spindleruv Mlyn in the Czech Republic, helping him to fifth in the slopestyle World Cup rankings for the season.

He has won three medals at FIS World Cup.

Competitive history
 2014 Winter Olympics

Personal life 
In a 2011 interview with British snowboarding magazine Whitelines, Nicholls confirmed that his favourite resort is Mayerhoffen, his favourite colour is blue, and his favourite spread is Nutella.

He is the cousin of snowboarder Katie Ormerod.

References

External links
 
 Nicholls Sochi profile 

1993 births
Living people
English male snowboarders
Olympic snowboarders of Great Britain
Snowboarders at the 2014 Winter Olympics
Snowboarders at the 2018 Winter Olympics
Sportspeople from Bradford